Highway 310 is a highway in the Canadian province of Saskatchewan. It runs from Highway 10/Highway 22 near Balcarres to Highway 5 near Kuroki.

Highway 310 passes near the communities of Ituna and Foam Lake. It also passes near the Fishing Lake Regional Park and Ottman-Murray Beach.

Major intersections
From south to north:

References

310